The 1974–75 Ranji Trophy was the 41st season of the Ranji Trophy. Bombay regained the title defeating defending champions Karnataka.

Group stage

West Zone

North Zone

East Zone

South Zone

Central Zone

Knockout stage

Final

Scorecards and averages
Cricinfo
Cricketarchive

References

External links

1975 in Indian cricket
Domestic cricket competitions in 1974–75
Ranji Trophy seasons